Minas de Baruta is a town in the state of Miranda, Venezuela. It is a parish of the Baruta Municipality in the urban area of Caracas.

Baruta Municipality
Populated places in Miranda (state)